Azilia is a genus of long-jawed orb-weavers that was first described by Eugen von Keyserling in 1881. It is a senior synonym of Cardimia.

Species
 it contains eleven species, found in Central America, South America, Cuba, on Saint Vincent and the Grenadines, and in the United States:
Azilia affinis O. Pickard-Cambridge, 1893 – USA to Panama
Azilia boudeti Simon, 1895 – Brazil
Azilia eximia (Mello-Leitão, 1940) – Brazil
Azilia formosa Keyserling, 1881 (type) – Peru
Azilia guatemalensis O. Pickard-Cambridge, 1889 – Central America to Peru, St. Vincent
Azilia histrio Simon, 1895 – Brazil
Azilia integrans (Mello-Leitão, 1935) — Brazil
Azilia marmorata Mello-Leitão, 1948 – Guyana
Azilia montana Bryant, 1940 – Cuba
Azilia rojasi Simon, 1895 – Venezuela
Azilia vachoni (Caporiacco, 1954) – French Guiana

In synonymy:
A. mexicana Banks, 1898 = Azilia affinis O. Pickard-Cambridge, 1893
A. vagepicta Simon, 1895 = Azilia affinis O. Pickard-Cambridge, 1893

Formerly placed here
 Azilia  leucostigma Mello-Leitão, 1941– now in Galianoella

See also
 List of Tetragnathidae species

References

Araneomorphae genera
Taxa named by Eugen von Keyserling
Tetragnathidae